Bouïra is the capital of Bouïra Province, Algeria. The city is also called "Garanda" by the locals.

Demographics
It has 75,086 inhabitants as of the 1998 census, which gives it 15 seats in the PMA.

Geography
It is located in the geographical heart of the province. It borders the municipality of Ait Laziz in the north, Aïn Turk in the north-east (home to the largest aqueduct in Africa), Aïn El Hadjar in the east, El Hachimia in the south-east, Oued El Berdi in the south, El Asnam in the south-west, Haizer in the west, and Taghzourt in the north-west.

References

External links

Kabylie
Populated places in Bouïra Province
Province seats of Algeria
Algeria